"Forever" is a song by Canadian singer Justin Bieber featuring American rappers and singers Post Malone and Clever. This track marks Bieber and Malone's second collaboration, following Bieber's feature on Malone's 2016 single "Deja Vu", from his debut studio album Stoney (2016). "Forever" is a trap song about an extreme urge to be with another individual until the end of their life. 

"Forever" was well-received by professional critics, who made favorable comments towards the vocal performances, the contributions of the guest stars, sound and composition. It peaked within the top 40 in more than 15 territories, among them the United States, where the song debuted at number 24 on the Billboard Hot 100 chart. It also reached the top 20 in Bieber's home country on the same magazine's Canadian Hot 100.

Background and composition
On January 3, 2020, TMZ reported that Post Malone was among the featured artists to appear on Justin Bieber's upcoming album. Bieber had completed his parts for the collaboration and was waiting on vocals from Malone. Bieber last collaborated with Malone on the song "Deja Vu", featured on the latter's debut studio album Stoney (2016). Forever was one of the names being thrown around as a possible title for the new album, with Bieber also recently getting the word tattooed on his neck. On February 5, Bieber revealed the tracklist for Changes, which listed Malone and rising hip hop artist Clever as features on the seventh track titled "Forever". According to Dustin Fox of The Gadsden Times, Clever recorded his vocals in Gadsden at GAD3 Studios.

"Forever" is a trap song set in the key of C minor with a tempo of 136 beats per minute. Lyndsey Havens of Billboard remarked that it is one of the few songs on Changes "that strays from more traditional-sounding R&B". NMEs Hannah Mylrea described the track as a "jangly cut" with "upbeat production and warm, nostalgic beats". Jeremy Helligar of Variety noted the song's use of "plunky synths", which he characterized as "sound[ing] like drops of water". Alexis Petridis of The Guardian compared the vocal delivery on the song to that of mumble rap. It is a love song dealing with one's "overpowering urge to be with [another] until the end of [their] days".

Critical reception
Lynn Sharpe from HotNewHipHop praised the vocals on "Forever", feeling that Bieber and Malone "compliment[ed] each other" in a seamless manner and that Clever beautifully reflected the track's "passionate nature". Billboard critic Taylor Weatherby ranked it as the third-best song on Changes and regarded it as "one of the most distinctive tracks" on the album, highlighting "[t]he plinking production, the staccato chorus, Post Malone's very Posty verse and Clever's punchy lines". Koltan Greenwood of Alternative Press called the song "a catchy and emotional bop". The A.V. Clubs Annie Zaleski felt it was one of  Changess "most enduring moments", adding that Malone and Clever bring "gruff vulnerability" to the song. Carolyn Droke from Uproxx wrote that the song "boasts a full, resounding beat and succinct lyrical delivery". Pitchforks Jayson Greene considered Malone's guest appearance one of the "[s]cattered bright spots" on Changes.

However, Ben Devlin from musicOMH found Clever's voice on "Forever" to be "obnoxiously weak". Joshua Bote of Paste remarked that Malone "adds a frantic tension to the cut", but disapproved of Bieber as "sound[ing] drained". Hannah Mylrea of NME thought that the song "begins to drag" after the start before it "stutter[s] to a stop". The Music writer Cyclone said that the track "never really goes anywhere" aside from the vocal performances.

Commercial performance
In the United States, "Forever" debuted at number 24 on the Billboard Hot 100 chart dated February 29, 2020. It became Clever's first Hot 100 hit. Furthermore, it was one of the eight tracks from Changes to debut on the Hot R&B Songs chart. It led the pack with an entrance at number six and secured Bieber's 10th top 10 entry on the chart. On the UK Singles Chart, the song debuted at number 29 as the third top 40 track from Changes, after "Yummy" and "Intentions".

Music video
A dance visual for "Forever", directed by Nick DeMoura, was released on March 9, 2020, as part of a collection of 16 music videos titled Changes: The Movement. In an interview with MTV News, DeMoura said the video came about after being inspired by the film Entrapment (1999). Straying away from the previous visuals for "Habitual" and "All Around Me" which focus on intimate and intricate routines, the video centers around a group of masked performers wearing riot gear-styled attire that dance as lights flicker around them. Trey Alston from MTV News described it as a high-tech espionage thriller with a cinematic flair.

Credits and personnel 
Credits adapted from Tidal.

 Justin Bieber – vocals, songwriter
 Post Malone – featured vocals, songwriter
 Clever – featured vocals, songwriter
 Poo Bear – producer, songwriter
 Louis Bell – songwriter, vocal producer, recording engineer
 HARV – producer, songwriter, keyboards
 Ali Darwish – songwriter
 Billy Walsh – songwriter
 Chris "TEK" O'Ryan – recording engineer
 JJ Stevens – recording engineer
 Josh Gudwin – recording engineer, mixer, vocal producer
 Elijah Marrett-Hitch – assistant mixer
 Chenao Wang – assistant recording engineer
 Colin Leonard – mastering engineer

Charts

Weekly charts

Year-end charts

Certifications

References

2020 songs
Justin Bieber songs
Post Malone songs
Songs written by Justin Bieber
Songs written by Post Malone
Songs written by Louis Bell
Songs written by Poo Bear
Song recordings produced by Poo Bear
Def Jam Recordings singles